Whananaki is a locality on the east coast of Northland, New Zealand. Whangarei is to the southwest. Te Wairahi Stream flows from the northwest into Whananaki Inlet, a wide tidal estuary which separates Whananaki from Whananaki South. Sandy Bay lies to the southeast. A long wooden footbridge connects Whananaki North and Whananaki South, with an alternative connection being a  road that crosses the river above the estuary. Hikurangi is about 22 km southwest of Whananaki South.

The area was reputedly named by Puhi, the captain of the legendary waka Mātaatua. The Māori-language word Whananāki means "kicking", and the name arose because mosquitoes caused Puhi to sleep restlessly.

Marae

Whananāki Marae and Whakapaumahara meeting house are a meeting place for Ngāti Rehua and the Ngātiwai hapū of Te Āki Tai.

Work began on redeveloping the marae in December 2018.

In October 2020, the Government committed $341,028 from the Provincial Growth Fund towards continuing the upgrade, creating 14 jobs.

Education

Notable people

Winston Peters, leader of New Zealand First
Jim Peters, politician

Notes

Whangarei District
Populated places in the Northland Region